Komori Dam  is a dam in Kumano, Mie Prefecture, Japan. Construction of the dam began in 1963 and was completed in 1965.

References 

Dams in Mie Prefecture
Dams completed in 1965